{{Speciesbox
| name = Fungia fungites
| image = Fungiafungites.jpg
| status = NT
| status_system = IUCN3.1
| status_ref = 
| parent_authority = Lamarck, 1801 <ref name=worms>{{cite WoRMS |author=Martinez, Olga |year=2012 |title=Fungia Lamarck, 1801|id=206375|access-date=2018-07-25}}</ref>
| taxon = Fungia fungites
| authority = (Linnaeus, 1758) 
| synonyms = 
(Genus)
 Fungia (Fungia) Lamarck, 1801
(Species)
 Fungia agariciformis Lamarck, 1801 
 Fungia confertifolia Dana, 1846 
 Fungia crassilamellata Milne Edwards & Haime, 1860 
 Fungia crassolamellata Milne Edwards & Haime, 1851 
 Fungia dentata Dana, 1846 
 Fungia haemei Verrill, 1864 
 Fungia papillosa Verrill, 1866 
 Fungia patella Ellis & Solander, 1786 
 Fungia pliculosa Studer, 1878 
 Fungia puishani Veron & DeVantier, 2000 
 Halomitra fungites Studer, 1901 
 Madrepora fungites Linnaeus, 1758

}}Fungia is a genus of corals in the family Fungiidae. It is monotypic with the single species Fungia fungites, which is found growing on reefs in the Indo-Pacific.

Taxonomy
Until 2015, the genus Fungia had more than 30 species, but based on recent studies it has now been reduced to a single species.Hoeksema, B. (2015). Fungia Lamarck, 1801. Accessed through: World Register of Marine Species at http://www.marinespecies.org/aphia.php?p=taxdetails&id=206375. World Marine Species Register. Retrieved on October 19, 2016.

Description

Corals of Fungia fungites are mostly solitary, some attaining  in diameter. The juveniles attach themselves to rock but larger individuals detach themselves and become free living. They are found in various bright colours including white, pink, red, purple, blue and yellow and are popular with keepers of reef aquariums. The discs are either round or oval and the central mouth, which is surrounded by tentacles, may be a slit. The polyp sits in a calcareous cup, the corallite. The septa are vertical skeletal elements inside the corallite wall and the costae join the septae and continue outside the corallite wall and underneath the coral. Both the septae and costae are robust. Fungia fungites may be confused with specimens of the related genus Cycloseris'' but the latter are always free living, even as juveniles, while the former bear a scar showing where they were attached when young. Fungia corals, like other large polyp stony corals, have developed several feeding strategies. They also capture planktonic organisms, food particles from the water column, and can absorb dissolved organic matter. Feeding tentacles are usually visible at night. Fungia also reproduce  asexually. Daughter colonies / polyps may form and they will form offspring from broken pieces. they show regeneration.

Gallery

References

External links
ReefCorner - Fungia Coral Database Entry
Acquarioitalia - Scheda Fungia SP

Fungiidae
Taxa named by Jean-Baptiste Lamarck
Cnidarian genera
Corals described in 1758
Taxa named by Carl Linnaeus